Three Girls Bakery is a bakery at Seattle's Pike Place Market, in the U.S. state of Washington. The business was founded by three women in 1921.

Description 

Three Girls Bakery is a bakery in the Sanitary Market building at Pike Place Market in Central Waterfront, Seattle. Seattle Metropolitan says, "Fat sandwiches cradled by Three Girls Bakery fresh baked bread and a variety of hot soups draw everyone from tourists to gnarled locals at this Pike Place Market staple." Eater Seattle has said, "This small, family-owned Pike Place Market business has been around for decades, serving loaves of sourdough, multigrain, and other types of bread, as well as a selection of sweeter items. The window is usually open until 6 p.m. daily, or until the bread sells out."

The menu has also included brownies, cakes, macaroons, muffins, pastries (including rugelach), scones, and coffee. Baked goods are displayed at a to-go window and a lunch counter serves sandwiches and soups; one special has marinated eggplant, hummus, onion, sprouts, tomato, and provolone on a sourdough baguette. The Meatloaf Sandwich has meatloaf, onions, mayonnaise, mustard, and barbecue sauce.

History 
Three Girls Bakery was founded by three women in 1912, becoming the first female-owned business in Seattle.

Andrew Zimmern visited the bakery in 2017.

Reception 
Jen Vafidis included the Meatloaf Sandwich in Men's Journal's 2015 list of "The 50 Best Sandwiches in America".

See also 

 List of bakeries

References

External links 

 
 Three Girls Bakery at Pike Place Market
 Three Girls Bakery at Zomato

1912 establishments in Washington (state)
Bakeries of Washington (state)
Central Waterfront, Seattle
Pike Place Market
Restaurants established in 1912
Restaurants in Seattle